Rowling may refer to:

People
 Bill Rowling (1927–1995), former Prime Minister of New Zealand
 Ian Rowling (born 1967), Australian sprint canoeist 
 J. K. Rowling (born 1965), British author of the Harry Potter series
 Reese Rowling (1928–2001), American businessman and geologist
 Robert Rowling (born 1953), American businessman

Other uses
 43844 Rowling, an asteroid named in honor of J.K. Rowling

See also 

 Rolling (disambiguation)
 Rollin (disambiguation)
 Rollings
 Tobi Adebayo-Rowling (born 1996), English football player
 Citizens for Rowling, a campaign named after Bill Rowling